Agaraea strigata is a moth of the family Erebidae. It was described by Reich in 1936. It is found in Colombia.

References

Moths described in 1936
Phaegopterina
Moths of South America